Probarbus is a genus of cyprinid freshwater fish found in Mainland Southeast Asia, especially the Mekong River.

Species 
 Probarbus jullieni Sauvage, 1880 (Jullien's golden carp, Isok barb)
 Probarbus labeamajor T. R. Roberts, 1992 (Thicklip barb)
 Probarbus labeaminor T. R. Roberts, 1992 (Thinlip barb)

References 

Cyprinidae genera
Cyprinid fish of Asia
Taxonomy articles created by Polbot